Galactica inornata is a moth in the family Galacticidae. It was first described by Walsingham in 1900. It is found in Yemen (Socotra).

The wingspan is about 12 mm. The forewings are dull greyish white, the veins and cell narrowly marked out by lines of brownish grey, the costa and the dorsum beneath the fold slightly suffused with the same. The hindwings are dirty whitish cinereous.

References

Moths described in 1900
Galacticidae
Endemic fauna of Socotra